Sourasay Keosouvandeng (born 20 February 1992, in Vientiane) is a Laotian football player who currently plays for Yotha in the Lao League. He is also a member of the Laos national football team where he made his debut for them on February 16, 2011 in a 1-1 draw against Chinese Taipei in a 2012 AFC Challenge Cup qualification game.

Honours
Lao League: 2011

References

External links 
 Player profile at Affsuzukicup.com
 
 

1992 births
Living people
Laotian footballers
Laos international footballers
Yotha F.C. players
Association football goalkeepers
People from Vientiane